Munavvirul Islam Rabbaniyya Shareeath College is a college located in Munavvir Nagar, Trikaripur, Kerala, India.  It was established in 1948 as Munavvirul Islamic Madrasa. The college is affiliated with and subordinate to Jamia Nooriya Arabic College.

Colleges in Kasaragod district
Educational institutions established in 1948
1948 establishments in India